Samoreau is a commune in the Seine-et-Marne department in the Île-de-France region in north-central France.

Demographics
Inhabitants of Samoreau are called Samoréens.

Famous residents 
 Matthias Blazek, German local historian and journalist, lived as a member of the German Military Delegation in France in the village from 1994 to 1999
 Jean-Pierre Lacloche, French writer, buried in the cemetery of Samoreau
 Olivier Larronde, French poet, buried in the cemetery of Samoreau
 Stéphane Mallarmé, French poet and critic, buried in the cemetery of Samoreau (next to his son Anatole)
 Bernard Baissait graphic design born in 1948
Misia Sert, buried in the cemetery of Samoreau in 1950.

See also
Communes of the Seine-et-Marne department

References

Bibliography 
 René Clément-Bayer, Alain Nicol, Cécile and Jean-Pierre Thibieroz: Samoreau. Samoreau 1978
 Pierre Grassat: La Libération de Samoreau 23–25 août 1944 – Récit d'un témoin. Samoreau 1996
 Pierre Grassat and Matthias Blazek: Pompes à bras et pompiers à Samoreau: L'Historique des Sapeurs-Pompiers de Samoreau 1898–1982. Introduced by Patrice Havard, Samoreau 1997
 Georges Guillory: Vulaines – Samoreau – Héricy, éditions Amatteis, Le Mée-sur-Seine 1993 
 Les Amis de Samois sur Seine: Valvins. Les Cahiers Samoisiens, Nr. 14/1993, Samois sur Seine 1993 ISSN 0338-120X
 Alain Nicol and Matthias Blazek: L'Histoire de la Grange aux Dîmes. Samoreau 1998
 Étienne Pivert de Sénancour and George Sand: Obermann. Paris 1863, p. 97
 Marie-Anne Sarda: Stéphane Mallarmé à Valvins. Livre du visiteur, Musée départemental Stéphane Mallarmé, Vulaines-sur-Seine 1995 
 René Clément-Bayer, Alain Nicol, Cécile and Jean-Pierre Thibieroz: La Mémoire d'un Village 1177–1987. Exhibition catalogue, exposition about the history of Samoreau, Samoreau 1987
 Comité de Jumelage Samoreau/Bernried: Bulletins No 1–4, Samoreau 1996–1999
 Prussia: Der deutsch-französische Krieg, 1870–71 / redigirt von der Kriegsgeschichtlichen Abtheilung des Großen Generalstabes. Berlin 1878, p. 60

External links

 Official site 
 1999 Land Use, from IAURIF (Institute for Urban Planning and Development of the Paris-Île-de-France région) 
 

Communes of Seine-et-Marne